This article lists the largest shopping malls in the Philippines by gross floor area.

SM Prime Holdings is the largest shopping retail operator in the Philippines with 78 operating malls totaling a gross floor area of 4.5 million square meters nationwide.

Malls by gross leasable area

Largest shopping malls by island group

Timeline

See also 
 List of largest shopping malls in the world
 List of shopping malls in the Philippines
 List of shopping malls in Metro Manila

Notes

References 

Philippines
Philippines
Shopping malls, Philippines
Shopping malls, largest
Shopping malls